Maximilian Buhk (born 9 December 1992 in Reinbek) is a retired German racing driver.

Career

Karting
Buhk began karting in 2004 and raced only in his native Germany for the majority of his career, working his way up from the junior ranks to progress through to the KF2 category by 2009, when he finished on fifth position in ADAC Kart Masters.

ADAC Formel Masters
2010 saw his debut in the ADAC Formel Masters championship with KUG Motorsport. Buhk finished twelfth in the championship with 12 point-scoring finishes. He remained in series for 2011 but switched to ma-con after five rounds with KUG Motorsport. The switch open road to the podium step at Lausitz and Assen and progress to ninth in the championship.

Sports car racing
For 2012 Buhk moved into the Sports car racing, competing in both 2012 ADAC GT Masters and 2012 FIA GT3 European Championship. Andreas Simonsen was Buhk's teammate in the ADAC series, where they finished eleventh. With Dominik Baumann they dominated the main category of the FIA GT3 European Championship, winning half of the races and the drivers' title on their Mercedes-Benz SLS AMG GT3.

In 2013, FIA GT3 European Championship was merged with FIA GT1 World Championship to form FIA GT Series, where Buhk continued to race. He was paired with Alon Day in HTP Motorsport, they was victorious at Zandvoort, but was only seventh in the championship. He remained in the ADAC GT Masters where he participated with Maximilian Götz. They won race at Nürburgring and ended third in the standings. Also he expanded his programme to compete in the Blancpain Endurance Series. Despite missing two opening rounds, he won 2013 24 Hours of Spa as well as the season finale at Nürburgring, which brought him title in the series.

In 2014, the Buhk kept his three-championship programme with HTP. FIA GT Series was renamed into the Blancpain Sprint Series. He again shared Mercedes-Benz SLS AMG with Götz and was set to claim another championship title after three wins but was forced to miss Slovakia Ring round and the remainder of the 2014 ADAC GT Masters season due to his suspension for non-compliance with safety car regulations in the same circuit in the ADAC GT Masters event. But later his racing license was restored, allowing him return to racing. In the Blancpain Endurance Series he had just one podium an ended the season fourth. Also for the first time Sprint and Endurance series formed Blancpain GT Series in which Buhk finished as runner-up to Laurens Vanthoor.

For 2015, Buhk concentrated on Blancpain GT Series programme, where he was again runner-up, this time to Robin Frijns. His team HTP decided to use Bentley Continental GT3 car and make Vincent Abril as his teammate in the Sprint Series. They won three races and clinched the championship title. But in the Endurance Series, Buhk raced with M-Sport team with Andy Soucek and Maxime Soulet as his teammates. They finished the season tenth finishing in point all races but 2015 24 Hours of Spa.

In 2016, Baumann returned as Buhk's teammate (Jazeman Jaafar was the third driver in the Endurance Cup), while HTP Motorsport bought new-for Mercedes-AMG GT3 car. Their pair overscored Rob Bell by ten points in the GT Series to take the title. While in the Endurance Cup and Sprint Cup they was second and third respectively with one race win in the two championships. Also he made his debut in the 2016 24 Hours of Nürburgring race, but his squad wasn't able to finish the race.

For 2017, Buhk got Franck Perera as a teammate for GT Series campaign while Jimmy Eriksson was the third driver in the Endurance Cup. Buhk got his third runner-up spot in the GT Series. He and his teammates were third in both the Endurance Cup and Sprint Cup. In the Sprint cup Buhk with Perera was more successful as they won main Misano race. He repeated 24 Hours of Nürburgring race, but once again his car haven't seen a checkered flag.

In 2018, HTP Motorsport left Blancpain GT Series in the favour of 2018 ADAC GT Masters, where Buhk is a teammate of the Indy Dontje. While in 2018 Blancpain GT Series Endurance Cup he joined Götz and Álvaro Parente at Strakka Racing.

After the 2022 DTM season, Buhk announced his retirement from racing, citing "shifting priorities".

Racing record

Career summary

* Season still in progress.

Complete WeatherTech SportsCar Championship results
(key) (Races in bold indicate pole position; results in italics indicate fastest lap)

Complete Deutsche Tourenwagen Masters results
(key) (Races in bold indicate pole position) (Races in italics indicate fastest lap)

References

External links
  
 

1992 births
Living people
People from Stormarn (district)
German racing drivers
ADAC Formel Masters drivers
Blancpain Endurance Series drivers
ADAC GT Masters drivers
24 Hours of Spa drivers
24 Hours of Daytona drivers
24H Series drivers
Deutsche Tourenwagen Masters drivers
GT World Challenge America drivers
Mercedes-AMG Motorsport drivers
Nürburgring 24 Hours drivers
Strakka Racing drivers
Mücke Motorsport drivers
Ma-con Motorsport drivers
Charouz Racing System drivers
WeatherTech SportsCar Championship drivers
M-Sport drivers